Arizona Quarterly: A Journal of American Literature, Culture, and Theory is a peer-reviewed academic literary journal created at the University of Arizona in 1945. Published four times per year, its self-proclaimed mission is to "subject  to debate, argument, interpretation, contestation via critical readings of primary texts". Most issues of the Quarterly consist of seven articles, and special issues are rarely published (e.g. Summer 2014: Migration and Movement(s) in Chicano/a Literature).  the editor is Lynda Zwinger.

During the early years of Arizona Quarterly, through 1958, there was no standalone historical journal in the state, leaving the Quarterly to publish a number of historical articles. Zwinger served as one of two associate editors under former Quarterly editor Edgar A. Dryden.

References

External links 
 

Quarterly journals
English-language journals
Literary magazines published in the United States
Magazines published in Arizona